Tumelo Thagane (born 3 July 1984 in Ratanda) is a South African athlete specialising in the triple jump. He represented his country at the World Championships without recording a valid jump. In addition, he won the bronze at the 2010 African Championships.

His personal best in the event is 17.09 metres (+1.9) set in Durban in 2010.

Competition record

References

1984 births
Living people
People from Lesedi Local Municipality
South African male triple jumpers
Sportspeople from Gauteng
Athletes (track and field) at the 2007 All-Africa Games
Athletes (track and field) at the 2011 All-Africa Games
African Games competitors for South Africa